Elvis Johnny Correa (born 19 March 1986) is a Brazilian football player who plays for Criciúma Esporte Clube.

Career
Elvis has played for Paraná in the Campeonato Brasileiro and Rio Branco-PR in the Copa do Brasil. Elvis joined Danish Superliga side Viborg FF in January 2008, but did not appear in any league matches for the club.

References

External links
 

1986 births
Living people
Brazilian footballers
Paraná Clube players
Viborg FF players
Rio Branco Sport Club players
Association football midfielders
Footballers from São Paulo